Costel Ionescu (born 2 April 1952) is a Romanian bobsledder. He competed in the two man and the four man events at the 1976 Winter Olympics.

References

1952 births
Living people
Romanian male bobsledders
Olympic bobsledders of Romania
Bobsledders at the 1976 Winter Olympics
Place of birth missing (living people)